Novoyasenevskaya, formerly Bittsevsky Park is a Moscow Metro station in the Yasenevo District, South-Western Administrative Okrug, Moscow. It is on the Kaluzhsko-Rizhskaya Line, serving as its southern terminus.

Name 
The station was originally named Bittsevsky Park for the nearby Bitsa Park. On 3 June 2008, the city government issued decree to rename the station to Novoyasenevskaya on 1 June 2009. Moscow Metro was granted a one-year transition period to effect the change. The new name reflects the station's location in the Yasenevo District along Novoyasenovo Ulitsa. The reason for the change was the city wanted to transfer the Bittsevsky Park name to the station on the Butovskaya line.

Building 
The station was designed by architects N. Shumakov, G. Mun, and N. Shurygina and has a tri-vault column structure. Novoyasenevskaya station walls and pillars are faced with deep pink marble and dark green metallic.

Novoyasenevskaya has two entrances, but only one is in operation due to the relatively low number of passengers handled by the station each day. The active entrance is a part of a subway beneath Novoyasenevsky Avenue. The unused ground-level eastern vestibule sits further down the road, on the edge of the park. It is a round building, finished with grey marble and pinkish granite and topped with a disproportionately large weather vane. The exit stairs at the east end of the platform, which lead to this vestibule, are barricaded.

Transfer
Bittsevsky Park station of the Butovskaya Line opened on 27 February 2014, providing a transfer between the two lines.

Gallery

References

Moscow Metro stations
Railway stations in Russia opened in 1990
Kaluzhsko-Rizhskaya Line
Railway stations located underground in Russia